House of Councillors elections were held in Japan on 4 July 1965, electing half the seats in the House. The Liberal Democratic Party won the most seats.

Results

By constituency

References

Japan
House of Councillors (Japan) elections
1965 elections in Japan
July 1965 events in Asia
Election and referendum articles with incomplete results